James Fazy (12 May 1794 – 6 November 1878) was a Swiss politician and President of the Swiss Council of States (1854). From 1846 to 1853 and from 1854 to 1861, Fazy was "conseiller d'Etat" (State councillor) in Geneva.

References

External links 

1794 births
1878 deaths
Politicians from Geneva
Swiss Calvinist and Reformed Christians
Members of the Council of States (Switzerland)
Presidents of the Council of States (Switzerland)
Members of the National Council (Switzerland)